Lithuanian raid on Poland was an attack of Grand Duchy of Lithuania and Duchy of Belz on the Kingdom of Poland that took place in autumn 1376. It was led by Kęstutis, Liubartas and Jurgis Narimantaitis. During the attack, Lithuanian forces crossed the San river and marched along the Vistula river until they got near Tarnów. During the attack, they raided the passed area and took approximately 23 000 people into captivity. After the attack, they retreated to the Duchy of Belz.

Bibliography 
Słownik wojen, bitew i potyczek w średniowiecznej Polsce by Piotr Bunar and Stanisław A. Sroka. Kraków, Universitas publishing house. p. 73

Lithuania–Poland relations
Battles of the Middle Ages
Battles involving Poland
Poland
Conflicts in 1376